József Gyuricza (16 January 1934 – 11 March 2020) was a Hungarian fencer. He won a bronze medal in the team foil event at the 1956 Summer Olympics.

References

External links
 

1934 births
2020 deaths
Hungarian male foil fencers
Olympic fencers of Hungary
Fencers at the 1956 Summer Olympics
Fencers at the 1960 Summer Olympics
Fencers at the 1964 Summer Olympics
Olympic bronze medalists for Hungary
Olympic medalists in fencing
People from Hódmezővásárhely
Medalists at the 1956 Summer Olympics
Sportspeople from Csongrád-Csanád County